Prosoplus xyalopus is a species of beetle in the family Cerambycidae. It was described by Ferdinand Karsch in 1881. It is known from Micronesia.

References

Prosoplus
Beetles described in 1881